Marilyn Harris may refer to:

 Marilyn Harris (actress) (1924–1999), American child actress who appeared in Frankenstein (1931)
 Marilyn Harris (writer) (1931–2002), American author

See also
Harris (surname)